Pöltl or Poltl is a surname.  Notable people with the name include:
Adam F. Poltl (1891–1969), American businessman and politician
Jakob Pöltl (born 1995), Austrian basketball player
Jennifer Pöltl (born 1993), Austrian footballer
Randy Poltl, American football player
Tom Poltl (born 1977), American soccer player